The 2001–02 Sanistål Ligaen season was the 45th season of ice hockey in Denmark. Ten teams participated in the league, and Rungsted IK won the championship.

First round

Second round

Group A

Group B

Playoffs

Relegation

External links
Season on hockeyarchives.info

Dan
Eliteserien (Denmark) seasons
2001 in Danish sport
2002 in Danish sport